Urban Trad is a Belgian folk music group, consisting of both Flemish and French speaking people and a close connection with Galicia.

Members

Yves Barbieux: flutes and Galician bagpipe
Veronica Codesal: vocals
Soetkin Collier: vocals
Sophie Cavez (replaced Didier Laloy): diatonic accordion
Philip Masure: acoustic guitar
Michel Morvan: drums (died 3 July 2010)
Dirk Naessens: violin
Marie-Sophie Talbot: vocals, piano and percussions (no longer with the band)
Bo Waterschoot: bass
Jill Delien: bass (since 2014)
Nicolas Scalliet: drums (since 2014)

Eurovision Song Contest

Urban Trad participated in the Eurovision Song Contest 2003, where they ended second with the song "Sanomi", a modern folk song with vocals in an imaginary language. A few months before the contest, the selectors dropped singer Soetkin Collier on the advice of the Belgian security services, who claimed that she'd had extreme right sympathies in the past. Collier vigorously denied the claims, and later that year after an investigation it was concluded that the accusations were exaggerated and based on outdated information.

As a result of this, two versions of the song exist on record.  One was the standard album version (4:08) and another version was released on single and on the Eurovision Song Contest 2003 collaboration album. Often known as the Eurovision edit, it cut down to 3:01 and it had Soetkin Collier's vocals removed.

Discography
One o Four (2001)
1. Subway Call      	
2. Avreel    	
3. La Belle Jig    	
4. Vodka Time    	
5. Waltzing Dranouter    	
6. Basement Scotch    	
7. Baline    	
8. Brass Corto    	
9. Bamboo    	
10. Free Wheel    	
11. Rap A Doo    	
12. Mecanix (Who'S Who) (after Waltzing Dranouter)
Kerua (2003)
1. Mecanix Remix      	
2. Kerua    	
3. Sanomi    	
4. Il Est Bien Temps    	
5. Lampang    	
6. Berim Dance    	
7. Quimper - Moscou    	
8. Get Reel    	
9. The Roses    	
10. Medina    	
11. Leina Street    	
12. Alto    	
13. Sanomi (Eurovision Edit)   	
14. Galicia
Elem (2004)
1. Rodgrod Med Flode     	
2. De Luz, Amor Y Nada    	
3. Vigo
4. Jorden/Terra    	
5. Bourrée d'Erasme    	
6. De L'Air
7. Valse    	
8. Two Hornpipes    	
9. Zout
10. Mind the Gap
11. V.T. Intro
12. Vodka Time (Mass'Mix)
13. Bonus : Lampang/Mideau Rhemila (live)	
Erbalunga  (2007)
1. Sans garde-fou
2. Hedningarden
3. Oh la belle
4. Le serpent
5. Erbalunga
6. Fields of Deeley
7. L'olivier
8. Bourrée Tappen
9. Accovi / Onderweg
10. Polaire
11. Noite Longa
12. Scottiche de la tête
13. Asturiana
14. A Terra
15. Diama Den (bonus)

References

External links

 

Belgian folk music groups
World music groups
New-age music groups
Eurovision Song Contest entrants for Belgium
Eurovision Song Contest entrants of 2003